The Dadasaheb Phalke Award is India's highest award in the field of cinema. It is presented annually at the National Film Awards ceremony by the Directorate of Film Festivals, an organisation set up by the Ministry of Information and Broadcasting. The recipient is honoured for their "outstanding contribution to the growth and development of Indian cinema" and is selected by a committee consisting of eminent personalities from the Indian film industry.

Presented first in 1969, the award was introduced by the Government of India to commemorate Dadasaheb Phalke's contribution to Indian cinema. Phalke (1870–1944), who is popularly known as and often regarded as "the father of Indian cinema", was an Indian filmmaker who directed India's first full-length feature film, Raja Harishchandra (1913).

The first recipient of the award was actress Devika Rani, who was honoured at the 17th National Film Awards. As of 2022, there have been 52 awardees. Among those, actor Prithviraj Kapoor (1971) and actor Vinod Khanna (2017) are the only posthumous recipients. Kapoor's actor-filmmaker son, Raj Kapoor, accepted the award on his behalf at the 19th National Film Awards in 1971 and was also himself a recipient in 1987 at the 35th National Film Awards ceremony.

Recipients also include several pairs of siblings, received this award in different years, for example: B. N. Reddy (1974) and B. Nagi Reddy (1986); Raj Kapoor (1987) and Shashi Kapoor (2014); Lata Mangeshkar (1989) and Asha Bhosle (2000); B. R. Chopra (1998) and Yash Chopra (2001). Veteran actor Asha Parekh was honoured in the 68th National Film Awards for the year 2020 in a function held in New Delhi, on 30 September 2022.

Recipients

Similarly named awards
Several other awards and film festivals have been named after Dadasaheb Phalke, sometimes leading to confusion. Such awards include the Dadasaheb Phalke International Film Festival, Dadasaheb Phalke Film Foundation Awards, Dadasaheb Phalke Excellence Awards,..etc which are unrelated to the award conferred by the Directorate of Film Festivals. Some prominent filmmakers, such as Shyam Benegal, have proposed that the Government of India step in to prevent such use of the Dadasaheb Phalke name but the Information and Broadcasting ministry has said that it could not do so since the names of the new awards are not an exact copy.

Explanatory notes

References

Bibliography

Further reading

External links

 Official Page for Directorate of Film Festivals, India

National Film Awards (India)
Lifetime achievement awards
Lists of Indian award winners